Qaleh Hasan may refer to:
 Qaleh Hasan, North Khorasan
 Qaleh Hasan, Firuzeh, Razavi Khorasan Province
 Qaleh Hasan, Sistan and Baluchestan
 Qaleh Hasan, Tehran
 Qaleh Hasan, West Azerbaijan